The Fiji School of Medicine is a tertiary institution based in Suva, Fiji. Originally established in 1885 as the Suva Medical School. FSM became the College of Medicine, Nursing & Health Sciences as part of Fiji National University in 2010. It is located on the main island of Viti Levu in the Fiji Islands.

History
The school was first established in 1885 as the Suva Medical School to train rural medical practitioners for a three-year course. The first students graduated in 1888. In 1928 it was renamed the Central Medical School and began to accept students from other Pacific island territories. The course was expanded to four years in 1933, and to five years in 1956, with dentists graduating from 1945.

The school adopted its current name in 1961. From 1970 onwards efforts were made to incorporate the school into the University of the South Pacific.

The school was incorporated into Fiji National University in 2010. It now provides training in most health science disciplines including medicine, dentistry, pharmacy, physiotherapy, radiography, laboratory technology, public health, health services management, dietetics and environmental health.

Courses offered
Bachelor of Dental Surgery
Bachelor of Dietetics and Nutrition
Bachelor of Environmental Health
Bachelor of Health Promotion
Bachelor of Health Services Management
Bachelor of Medical Imaging Science
Bachelor of Medical Laboratory Science
Bachelor of Medicine and Bachelor of Surgery (MBBS)
Bachelor of Nursing
Bachelor of Oral Health
Bachelor of Pharmacy
Bachelor of Physiotherapy
Bachelor of Public Health
Master in Emergency Medicine
Master in Pathology	Masters
Master in Public Health - Non Communicable Diseases (NCD)
Master of Applied Epidemiology
Master of Health Services Management
Master of Medicine in Anaesthesia
Master of Medicine in Internal Medicine
Master of Medicine in Obstetrics and Gynaecology	Masters
Master of Medicine in Ophthalmology
Master of Medicine in Paediatrics
Master of Medicine in Surgery
Master of Oral Surgery
Master of Public Health
Master of Public Health by Research

See also
Medical officers in Fiji

References

External links 
University homepage

Universities and colleges in Fiji
Educational institutions established in 1885
Medicine in Fiji
1885 establishments in Fiji